Mads Pagh Bruun (5 September 1809, in Fredericia  – 23 September 1884) was a Danish politician and speaker of the Landsting, a chamber of the parliament. He was a member of the National Constitutional Assembly from 1848 to 1849, a member of the Landsting from 1849 to 1853 and again from 1857 to 1874 and a member of the Folketing from 1854 to 1855, representing the National Liberal Party.

References
Bille, C. St. A. (1889). "Bruun, Mads Pagh"  in C. F. Bricka (ed.) Dansk Biografisk Lexikon tillige omfattende Norge for Tidsrummet 1537–1814. III. bind, Brandt — Clavus. Copenhagen: Gyldendal, pp. 171–72.
Skou, Kaare R. (2005). Dansk politik A-Å . Aschehoug, p. 128. .

1809 births
1884 deaths
People from Fredericia
Speakers of the Landsting (Denmark)